Only a Factory Girl is a 1911 Australian film. Very little is known about it and it is considered a lost film.

It premiered at the Victoria Theatre in Sydney and was called "one of the most sentimental and strongest picture dramas yet produced at this continuous picture house."

The film also screened in Adelaide.

References

External links
 Only a Factory Girl at IMDb

1911 films
1910s Australian films
Australian drama films
Australian black-and-white films
Australian silent short films
Lost Australian films
1911 drama films
1911 lost films
1911 short films
Lost drama films
Silent drama films